Petar Živković (1 January 1879 – 3 February 1947) was a Serbian military officer and political figure in Yugoslavia. He was Prime Minister of the Kingdom of Yugoslavia from 7 January 1929 until 4 April 1932.

Life

Petar Živković was born in Negotin, Principality of Serbia (present-day Bor District, Serbia) in 1879. He finished secondary school in Zajecar and the Military Academy in Belgrade.
A soldier at the Serbian court, he helped overthrow the Obrenović dynasty with the assassination of King Alexander I of Serbia (11 June), which was orchestrated by Colonel Dragutin Dimitrijević, the founder and leading member of the secret nationalist organization Black Hand. Živković later founded the secret organization White Hand in 1912, which served to counter the power of the Black Hand.
 
In 1921, King Alexander I of Yugoslavia appointed Živković commander of the Royal Guard, but he was briefly demoted due to accusations by a young guardsman that he tried to seduce him. In 1929 he was appointed Prime Minister as part of the 6 January Dictatorship. General Živković was Bogoljub Jevtić's brother-in-law, the closest adviser to the head of State.

Živković held the office as a member of the Yugoslav Radical Peasants' Democracy (JRSD), which became the only legal party in Yugoslavia, following electoral reforms. He resigned as prime minister in 1932, and shortly thereafter founded the Yugoslav National Party (JNS), becoming its president in 1936.

Following Alexander I assassination in 1934, His cousin Pavle Karađorđević took office as regent for the 11-year-old Petar II. Upon Pavle's 1941 signing of the Tripartite Pact, Živković left Yugoslavia ahead of the Nazi invasion. He became part of the Yugoslav government in exile.

In 1946 he was tried in absentia in the Federal People's Republic of Yugoslavia at the Trial of Mihailović et al. and sentenced to death by the communist authorities. He was forced into exile, leaving for Italy and eventually settling in France, dying in Paris in February 1947, aged 68.

In popular culture

Živković is portrayed by Nebojša Dugalić in the Serbian television series Balkan Shadows.

References

External links
Biography at VOA 

1879 births
1947 deaths
People from Negotin
Prime Ministers of Yugoslavia
Serbian politicians
Serbian soldiers
Marshals of the Court (Serbia, Yugoslavia)
Yugoslav National Party politicians
People sentenced to death in absentia
Burials at Belgrade New Cemetery